The 1929 Arkansas Razorbacks football team represented the University of Arkansas in the Southwest Conference (SWC) during the 1929 college football season. In their first year under head coach Fred Thomsen, the Razorbacks compiled a 7–2 record (3–2 against SWC opponents), finished in sixth place in the SWC, and outscored their opponents by a combined total of 230 to 93.

College Football Hall of Famer Wear Schoonover intercepted an Arkansas record five passes against Texas A&M.

Schedule

^ indicates a designated conference game.

References

Arkansas
Arkansas Razorbacks football seasons
Arkansas Razorbacks football